Halal (Marathi: हलाल) is 2017 Marathi language social drama film, directed by national award-winning director Shivaji Lotan Patil and produced by Amol Kagne, Laxman Kagne under the banner of Amol Kagne Productions. It is their first film, and it deals with the theme of loyalty, love and the institution of marriage that is deemed to be pious by the society. Portraying the family system of Indian Muslims, the film depicts human emotions, and the trials and the tribulations that women in our society go through. The film features Chinmay Mandlekar, Priyadarshan Jadhav, Pritam Kagne and Vijay Chavan in pivotal roles.

Halal was premiered at the Pune International Film Festival 2016. It was also screened at the 2016 Aurangabad International Film Festival. The film was screened at the Cannes Film Festival and at Goa Marathi Film Festival 2016.

The film was theatrically released on 6 October 2017.

Synopsis
Halim is divorced by her husband, but  he comes back deciding to re-marry her. As per religion Halim has to undergo  halala, that she has to marry another man, consummate relationship, divorce him and then marry her first husband. A Maulana offers to do that. Maulana showers her with love and care and she gets confused between staying and leaving the current marriage.

Cast
 Chinmay Mandlekar
 Priyadarshan Jadhav 
 Pritam Kagne
 Vijay Chavan
 Amol Kagne
 Chhaya Kadam
 Vimal Mhatre

Production
Amol Kagne and Laxman Kagne produced this movie. Story and dialogues written by Nishant Dhapse, DOP is Ramani Ranjandas, editing by Nilesh Gavand. Music given by Vijay Gatlewar and songs sung by Adarsh Shinde and Vijay Gatlewar.

Release
The official trailer of the film was unveiled by Rajshri Marathi on 14 September 2017.

The film was theatrically released on 6 October 2017.

Reception
Halal was screened at the Pune International Film Festival, the Yashvantrao Chavan International Film Festival and the Aurangabad International Film Festival. The film has received highly positive reviews from audience, critics & media. Screenplay writer Nishant Dhapse won the "Best Marathi Screenplay Award" at Pune International Film Festival. Halal was also screened at the Cannes Film Festival, scheduled between 11 and 22 May 2016. Halal was also screened at the Goa Film Festival, receiving overwhelming response.There were about 20 films screened during this film festival, including one Konkani film. Halal was screened at the Godrej International Film Festival 2016 on 12 August 2016. Halal was screened at the 47th International Film Festival of India was held during 20 to 28 November 2016 at Goa. Halal was screened at the Delhi International Film Festival 2016 held between 3 and 9 December at Central Park and NDMC Convention Centre, Connaught Place New Delhi. The film is also scheduled to screen at Asian Film Festival.

Soundtrack

The songs for the film are composed by  Vijay Gatlewar and lyrics by Subodh Pawar and Sayed Akhtar.

Accolades 
Halal film garnered many awards and nominations in several categories with praise for Shivaji Lotan-Patil's direction, cinematography, production design, costumes, and cast's performances. At the Maharashtra State Film Awards 2016, the film won 6 awards. It was also nominated for Sanskruti Kaladarpan Awards 2016.

See also
 List of Marathi films

References

External links
 

Indian drama films
2010s Marathi-language films
Films about social issues in India
2016 drama films